Damian Johnson may refer to:

Damian Johnson (broadcaster), British sports broadcaster
Damian Johnson (basketball) (born 1987), basketball player for the Minnesota Golden Gophers
Damian Johnson (American football) (born 1962), former American football player

See also
Damien Johnson (born 1978), Northern Irish former footballer